Tommy Barbarella (born Thomas Elm) is an American keyboardist. He was a member of The New Power Generation, Prince's recording and stage band, from 1991 to 1996.

Barbarella also played on Miley Cyrus's album, Breakout. In 2010, Barbarella became a member of Nick Jonas & the Administration (a side project of Nick Jonas of the Jonas Brothers) along with other former members of The New Power Generation, drummer Michael Bland and bass player Sonny T.

References

External links
Official site
[ Tommy Barbarella] at AllMusic

American funk keyboardists
American pop keyboardists
American rhythm and blues keyboardists
Place of birth missing (living people)
Year of birth missing (living people)
American rock keyboardists
American soul keyboardists
Living people
New Power Generation members
Nick Jonas & the Administration members
21st-century American keyboardists
20th-century American keyboardists